Miss USA 2002 was the 51st Miss USA pageant, held at Genesis Convention Center in Gary, Indiana on March 1, 2002. The event was won by Shauntay Hinton of the District of Columbia, who was crowned by outgoing queen Kandace Krueger of Texas. This is the second year in a row and third time since 1995 a Miss Teen USA state delegate did not win or inherit the Miss USA title.

This was the last Miss USA show to be aired on CBS. Beginning with the next Miss USA pageant, NBC assumed co-ownership of the pageant along with Donald Trump, and as a result began televising the pageant.

Hinton was the first African-American woman to win the pageant since Chelsi Smith held the title in 1995, and was the first titleholder from District of Columbia since 1964. This is the first time in pageant history that four delegates in the Top 5 were African-American.

Results

Placements

Special awards

Final competition scores

 Winner
 First Runner-Up
 Second Runner-Up
 Third Runner-Up
 Fourth Runner-Up

Delegates
The Miss USA 2002 delegates were:

 Alabama – Tara Tucker
 Alaska – Christine Olejniczak
 Arizona – Jennifer Lenz
 Arkansas – Amber Boatman
 California – Tarah Marie Peters
 Colorado – Keely Gaston
 Connecticut – Alita Dawson
 Delaware – Deborah Ann Hoffman
 District of Columbia – Shauntay Hinton Florida – Shannon Ford
 Georgia – Heather Hogan
 Hawaii – Juliet Lighter
 Idaho – Hilary Ball
 Illinois – Amanda Reynolds
 Indiana – Kelly Lloyd
 Iowa – Lauren Wilson
 Kansas – Lindsey Douglas
 Kentucky – Elizabeth Arnold
 Louisiana – Anne-Katherine Lené
 Maine – Su-Ying Leung
 Maryland – Misti Adams
 Massachusetts – Latoyia Foster
 Michigan – Rebekah Lynn Decker
 Minnesota – Lanore van  Buren
 Mississippi – Heather Soriano
 Missouri – Melana Scantlin
 Montana – Meredith McCannel
 Nebraska – Stacey Skidmore
 Nevada – Jenny Valdez
 New Hampshire – Audra Paquette
 New Jersey – Robin Williams
 New Mexico – Ellyn Colyer
 New York –  Karla Cavalli
 North Carolina – Alison English
 North Dakota – Amy Elkins
 Ohio – Kimberly Mullen
 Oklahoma – Kasie Head
 Oregon – Kristi Walkowski
 Pennsylvania – Nicole Bigham
 Rhode Island – Janet Sutton
 South Carolina –  Ashley Williams
 South Dakota – Sitania Syrovatka
 Tennessee – Allison Alderson
 Texas – Kasi Kelly
 Utah – Abbie Smith
 Vermont – Brooke Angus
 Virginia – Julie Laipply
 Washington – Carly Shorten
 West Virginia – Angela Davenport
 Wisconsin – Cortney Owen
 Wyoming – Jeannie Crofts

 Historical significance 
 District of Columbia wins competition for the second time. This became the first win for the District of Columbia in 38 years, when Bobbie Johnson won Miss USA 1964.
 Kansas earns the 1st runner-up position for the second time. The last time it placed this was in 1996.
 Indiana earns the 2nd runner-up position for the second time. The last time it placed this was in 1966. Also had its highest placement since 1981.
 Minnesota earns the 3rd runner-up position for the first time and reaches its highest placement since 1995.
 Connecticut earns the 4th runner-up position for the first time and reaches its highest placement since 1966.
 States that placed in semifinals the previous year were District of Columbia, Rhode Island and Texas. All of them made their second consecutive placement. 
 Alabama, Kansas, New York and South Carolina last placed in 2000.
 California and Indiana last placed in 1999.
 Louisiana last placed in 1998.
 Minnesota last placed in 1995.
 Connecticut last placed in 1969.
 Georgia breaks an ongoing streak of placements since 2000.
 Tennessee breaks an ongoing streak of placements since 1999.
 Michigan''' breaks an ongoing streak of placements since 1998.

Swimsuit controversy
Controversy erupted over the choice of swimsuits for the swimsuit final competition. Six of the 51 delegates chose an all-red one-piece, while the rest wore a two-piece option.  The New York Post reported one contestant, Tarah Marie Peters of California, had points deducted by one judge because of her choice of a one-piece suit, thus eliminating her from the top five contestants.  She was the only one of the top twelve who wore the one-piece option.

Crossovers
Ten delegates had previously competed in either the Miss Teen USA or Miss America pageants, including the two Triple Crown winners who had competed in both.  One delegate later won a Miss America state title.

Delegates who had previously held a Miss Teen USA state title were:
Kelly Lloyd (Indiana) - Miss Indiana Teen USA 1993 (1st runner-up at Miss Teen USA 1993)
Nicole Bigham (Pennsylvania) - Miss Pennsylvania Teen USA 1994
Allison Alderson (Tennessee) - Miss Tennessee Teen USA 1994 (Top 6 finalist at Miss Teen USA 1994)
Melana Scantlin (Missouri) - Miss Missouri Teen USA 1995 (Top 12 semi-finalist at Miss Teen USA 1995)
Tara Tucker (Alabama) - Miss Alabama Teen USA 1997
Alita Dawson (Connecticut) - Miss Connecticut Teen USA 1997
Elizabeth Arnold (Kentucky) - Miss Kentucky Teen USA 1998
Christine Olejniczak (Alaska) - Miss Alaska Teen USA 2000

Delegates who had previously held a Miss America state title or would later win one were:
Keely Gaston (Colorado) - Miss Colorado 1998
Heather Soriano (Mississippi) - Miss Mississippi 1999
Kelly Lloyd (Indiana) - Miss Indiana 1999 (Albert A. Marks Jr. Interview award)
Allison Alderson (Tennessee) - Miss Tennessee 1999
Audra Paquette (New Hampshire) - Miss New Hampshire 2005

Delegates who participate in other beauty pageant later are:
Brooke Elizabeth Angus (Vermont) - Representative of United States in Miss World 2006.

Judges
Tom Brady
Joyce Brothers
Willa Ford
Jermaine Jackson
Kim Powers
Audrey Quock
Victor Williams
Nikki Ziering

See also
Miss Universe 2002

References

External links
Miss USA official website 

2002
2002 beauty pageants
March 2002 events in the United States
2002 in Indiana